Charles Martin (April 26, 1817 – March 10, 1888) was twice an acting President of Hampden–Sydney College from 1848 to 1849 and again from 1856 to 1857.

Biography
Charles Martin attended Jefferson College where he was a member of the Gamma chapter of the Beta Theta Pi fraternity. Martin graduated from Jefferson College in 1842 and spent the majority of his career as an educator. From 1847 until 1871 he was a professor of Languages — interrupted for two years by service in the Confederate States Army as adjutant, lieutenant and captain.

After he left Hampden–Sydney he taught at Virginia Tech, and, in 1876, was awarded an LL.D. degree by both Hampden–Sydney and Washington & Jefferson. In his later years he served as a government clerk and Clerk of a United States District Court.

References

1817 births
1888 deaths
Presidents of Hampden–Sydney College
Presbyterian Church in the United States of America ministers
19th-century American clergy